Democratic elections were held in the Republic of Colombia on October 28, 2007. The elections were organized as established by the Colombian Constitution of 1991 by the National Electoral Council (Consejo Nacional Electoral, CNE) to elect Department governors with its respective Department Assemblies, Mayors with their respective City Councils and the Local Administrative Juntas (JAL).

The elections have been marked by the assassination of 22 candidates and the kidnapping of at least two. The main armed group targeting the elections is the marxist leninist guerrilla Revolutionary Armed Forces of Colombia (FARC), as part of the Colombian armed conflict with the government of Colombia. The President of Colombia Álvaro Uribe Vélez publicly called not to vote for those candidates preferred by the FARC or candidates who were offering to buy people's vote.  While in some areas there are reports of untrusting the elections due to the break out of the Parapolitica scandal in 2006 in which it was discovered that members of the demobilized paramilitary group United Self-Defense Forces of Colombia (AUC) had been colluding with political leaders and members of the public force in order thwart adversaries and advance politically.

On this date some 27 million Colombians are apt to vote to elect between some 86 thousand candidates to represent 1,098 Colombian municipalities and 32 governors of Colombian Departments. Colombian authorities mobilized 167,559 soldiers and policemen in order to vigil the 9,950 voting sites.

Irregularities in election process
The Colombian newspaper El Tiempo reported that the National Registrar of the Civil State (Registraduria Nacional del Estado Civil) announced several changes in some voting sites in the Colombian Caribbean region: In Cartagena and Magangué in Bolívar Department, Gonzalez in Cesar Department, Barranquilla and Malambo in Atlántico Department and Santa Marta and El Retén in Magdalena Department after there were reports of irregularities.

The local newspaper El Nuevo Día from Ibagué, Tolima Department reported that opposition groups to Major Bolívar Guzmán blocked access to the town of Valle de San Juan also in Tolima Department, alleging that there had been a manipulation of the election process. The blockage prevented functionaries of the National Registrar from establishing elements needed for voting. Members of the Colombian National Police and the Colombian Army were called to reestablish control in the town.

There were also reports of fraudulent techniques used to obtain more votes, the most common was the Trasteo electoral (Literally "Vote Carrying") in which for example a municipality gets more votes than its official population able to vote, as it occurred in the municipality of Piojó in Atlántico Department where there were 6,088 people subscribed as apt to vote, but its actual population apt to vote over 18 years old is 2,988.

Caracol Radio reported that there had been 49 people captured for committing electoral fraud crimes and there had been 26 denunciations reported to the Inspector General of Colombia Edgardo Maya among these the possession of numerous IDs used to illegally vote more than once and the exchange of votes for money or groceries for votes. Inspector General Maya-Villazon also discarded any possibility that elected candidates sanctioned with disciplinary sanctions, penal crimes, impeachment or any other fault on this elections will not be able to take office. He also mentioned that in case any of these candidates took office will be suspended from office.

Violence

A month before the elections there were already some 70 homicides related to the Colombian regional elections of 2007, including government officials, perpetrated by guerrillas, former and new paramilitary groups or common delinquency. This tendency of using violence to coerce the population escalated when the paramilitary groups influenced the previous 2003 regional, presidential and legislative elections.

Onservers part of the mission sent by the Organization of American States (OAS) formally accused the FARC of being the main cause of the disruptions to the electoral process. Not only from violence but from coercion, but also mentioned that the elections were not in danger but for some people in certain areas. Like during the electoral day the FARC used explosives to destroy electrical towers in the southern Colombian Department of Nariño. This action left without electricity an area covered by some 5 municipalities. The Ombudsman of Colombia accused the emerging paramilitary gangs of also thwarting the election process in some areas. Some of this groups included Aguilas Negras, Los Traquetos, Los Mellizos, ''Los de Barranquilla, Los Paisas, Los 40, Macacos, Cuchillos and la Organización Nueva Generación.

Post election

On October 29, 2007, a day after the election, protesters of the losing candidate for mayor in the municipality of Ciénaga de Oro, Córdoba Department rioted and burned down the City hall and the local office of the National Registrar of the Civil State, alleging that there had been fraud. The winning candidate Plinio Di Paola won with a difference of 15 vote over the losing candidate. Also in Córdoba Department, in the town of Ayapel the office of the National Registrar was stoned. A state of emergency was sanctioned in several other populations of the Córdoba Department.

References and notes

External links 
Votebien.com
National Electoral Council
National Registrar of Colombia

2007 elections in South America
Regional elections
2007